The Microcerberidea are a suborder of isopod crustaceans. They may be found in the eastern Pacific Ocean, and around the coasts of South America, Africa, the Mediterranean Sea, and India.

References

Isopoda
Arthropod suborders